Ališer Sijarić (born July 8, 1969) is a Bosnian contemporary classical music, electroacoustic music and computer music composer.

Education

Ališer Sijarić studied Composition with Josip Magdić at Sarajevo Music Academy and Musicology, Philosophy and Sociology at Faculty of Philosophy in Sarajevo. He continued his Composition studies with Michael Jarrell at University of Music and Performing Arts Vienna and attended  Composition courses with Beat Furrer und Hanspeter Kyburz in Graz. He is the son of notable professor and violinist Osman-Faruk Sijarić, former dean of Sarajevo Music Academy and grandson of well-known writer Ćamil Sijarić.

Cooperation and performances

He is member of the Composers group Gegenklang. Sijarić has been commissioned to write compositions by the  Konzerthaus, Vienna Gesellschaft Wien, Konzerthaus Berlin, Collegium Novum Zürich, Wiener Musikverein, Kammaransemblen Stockholm, Forum Alpbach Austria, Ensemble Cantus Zagreb, Pre Art Zürich, Ensemble Zeitfluss, Manhattan String Quartet, among others. His music was performed at many international music festivals, such as Kopenhagen - Kulturhuaptstadt Europas, Wien Modern, Salzburger Festspiele, Music Biennale Zagreb, Muskiprotokoll Graz, Culturscapes Basel, Chamber Music Festival Sarajevo and many others, in Austria, Bosnia and Herzegovina, Czech Republic, Denmark, Croatia, Italy, Republic of Macedonia, Germany, Poland, Romania, USA (Carnegie Hall), Serbia, Sweden, Switzerland, Ireland. He is founder of the Society of New Music Sarajevo – SONEMUS, Sonemus Fest and since year 2001, its artistic director.  He is active member of INSAM Institute for Contemporary Artistic Music.

Music style

Ališer Sijarić is pioneer in the field of Contemporary Music Composition and Contemporary Music Analysis in Bosnia and Herzegovina. His approach to Music Composition, as primarily thinking process, could be described as "deconstructed thinking process", because his fundamental compositional technique is filtration of overall material. Using noise, which could be represented also through white color (which contains all tones/colors, but none of them can be solved singularly) Sijarić sets hidden layers of whole composition at the very beginning of compositional process and forms cultivated noise. It can be understood as presumed system of artificial sound spectrum organization and of apabsolute micro-sound (or partial) stability, which represents the opposite to the nature (or behavior) of noise. Composition of "composition background" or "hidden layers source", which for many composers represent a final product, for Sijarić represents a starting point of filtration process development. Influenced by composers such as Beat Furrer, Gérard Grisey, Morton Feldman and research in the field of Philosophy, Semiology, Psychoacoustics and Electronic & Computer Music (using Computer as Composition Assistant), he developed his own compositional style.

Academic career

Prof. mr. Ališer Sijarić  is Professor of Music Composition, Computer Music and Orchestration at Sarajevo Music Academy of the University of Sarajevo and
he is also Head of Department for Music Composition. As of June 2020 he is the new Dean of Sarajevo Music Academy

Significant compositions

"Noise Prevails" for chamber ensemble", 
"Dah" for solo flute, 
"Snakes in Time" for orchestra, 
"Drei Farben" for flute, cello and piano, 
"Innerhalb aller sprachlichen Gestaltung..." for ensemble, 
"Cross Bowing" for string quartet, 
"Capriccio Meccanico" for violin and piano
"Deductio" for solo clarinet.

References

Other sources
Samson, Jim,  "Music in the Balkans",  Boston, 2013, BRILL. 
Čavlović, Ivan, "Historija muzike u Bosni i Hercegovini", Sarajevo, 2011, Muzička akademija. 

1969 births
Living people
Bosnia and Herzegovina composers
21st-century classical composers
Contemporary classical composers
University of Music and Performing Arts Vienna alumni
Musicians from Sarajevo
Academic staff of the University of Sarajevo